Baqerabad (also Romanized as Bāqerābād and Bāqirābād) is a village in Jafarabad Rural District, Jafarabad District, Qom County, Qom Province, Iran. At the 2006 census, its population was 1,282, in 279 families.

References 

Populated places in Qom Province